Slave Ship is a 1956 short science fiction novel by American writer Frederik Pohl, originally serialized in Galaxy. The scene is a world in the throes of a low-intensity global war, which appears to be an amplified representation of the Vietnam War, in which the U.S. was just beginning to be involved. The plot involves telepathy, speaking to animals, and, in the last few pages, an invasion by extraterrestrials.

The nominal adversaries in the novel are known as "cow-dyes", a corruption of Caodai, a religion of Vietnamese origin.  On the American side, telepaths, who are used in espionage and other covert activities, are falling victim to "the glotch", a fatal affliction which is believed to be a Caodai bio-weapon, transmitted telepathically.

Reception
Anthony Boucher reported Slave Ship to be "at once fascinating and disappointing." Boucher praised Pohl for his "Heinleinesque skill in the detailed indirect exposition of a convincing future," but faulted the novel as episodic, weakly characterized, and arbitrarily resolved.

References

External links
Slave Ship parts 1, 2, and 3 at the Internet Archive

1956 American novels
1956 science fiction novels
Works originally published in Galaxy Science Fiction
Alien invasions in novels
American science fiction novels
Fiction about animal communication
Ballantine Books books
Novels by Frederik Pohl
Novels about telepathy